Martin Müller (born 6 November 1970) is a Czech former professional football player.

Club statistics

References

External links

 iDNES.cz profile
 Vissel Kobe

1970 births
Living people
Czech footballers
Czech First League players
J1 League players
SK Slavia Prague players
FK Chmel Blšany players
FC Viktoria Plzeň players
FK Drnovice players
Vissel Kobe players
Czech expatriate footballers
Expatriate footballers in Japan

Association football defenders